The Purbeck Mining Museum exists to preserve and interpret the historic extractive industries in ball clay mining in the Isle of Purbeck. The museum is located adjacent to Norden station on the Swanage Railway and is open from the end of March to the end of September on weekends, some weekdays and Bank Holidays.

A redundant mine has been relocated to Norden with a railway laid around the site, a new engine shed and the restoration of wagons that worked on the lines around Norden.

One of the future aims of the museum is to construct a new building at Norden to house Secundus, a 2-foot 8 inch steam loco, wagons and other artefacts not on display at present. It will also contain a library and education centre.

It is planned to extend the narrow gauge railway to the other side of the Swanage Branch line to land owned by the group via Bridge 15. In 2010 a structural engineer surveyed Bridge 15, a skew bridge over the Swanage Railway. The condition of the bridge was good for a "temporary" bridge built in 1885. Since then the Bridge has been involved in a serious incident in which it has been severely damaged.

History

Middlebere Tramway

The Middlebere Tramway was funded by Benjamin Fayle, a close friend of Thomas Byerley of Wedgwood, the Staffordshire pottery. When the original owner of the clay pits, Barker Chofney, was declared bankrupt, Fayle took them over to ensure a reliable supply of Ball Clay for Wedgwood and other potteries. The Iron Rail Way, as it was originally known, opened in 1806. It was designed by John Hodgkinson using the same construction techniques as the Surrey Iron Railway. It was  gauge and 3.4 miles long. The rails were cast iron, L-shaped, 3 ft long and weighed 40 lb. The horse-drawn clay wagons had flangeless wheels, and the sleepers were simply stone blocks 60-70 lb each numbering well in excess of 10,000. The cast iron rails were secured to the sleepers with metal spike and oak dowel.

In 1807, the line was extended south under the Wareham to Corfe road. The tunnel exists and is a listed building, however it is blocked. A second tunnel was built in 1825 east of the first tunnel and it is also blocked. In 1881, when the LSWR built the Swanage line the Middlebere Tramway was extended east parallel to the new line and Eldons Sidings were built to transfer clay to the standard gauge network. In 1907, the tramway was abandoned after 101 years of service.

The quay at Middlebere Creek has fallen into disrepair and almost vanished. Some stone sleepers remain in place today, complete with holes where the rails used to be fixed, whilst others have been reused as paving stones at various locations. Others can be found in the walls at Middlebere Farm. In many places the route across Hartland moor can be traced.

Newton Tramway
In May 1854 a railway opened from the clay pits at Newton to Goathorn Pier on South Deep in Poole Harbour. The Admiralty had given permission for the building of the pier in 1852. The engine was named "Corfe" but was nicknamed "Tiny" because of its size. The nickname became its real name. An engine shed was built at Newton to house "Tiny" and was located alongside clay workers' cottages. The water required for "Tiny" was obtained by hand pump from a well to the south of the engine shed. The coal for "Tiny" would have been brought in by ship via Goathorn Pier. In 1907 the railway was joined to Norden and part of it became the "Fayles Tramway".

Fayles Tramway

The line was 5 3/4 miles in length, another locomotive was purchased. The railway enabled some of the clay from Norden to be exported via Goathorn pier and in turn some of the clay from Newton to exit Purbeck by train via Eldon Sidings. The railway was also used in 1924 to construct the Training Bank to maintain a navigable approach to Poole Harbour. It was constructed from limestone blocks (Portland and Purbeck stone) which were carried by the railway from Norden to Goathorn where they were loaded on to barges.

The line was constructed using flat-bottomed rail spiked to wooden sleepers with earth ballast in a conventional way. There was an additional locomotive shed at Norden and trackwork included a short branch at Bushey. Other features included a wooden bridge over the Corfe River.

By 1937 the Newton line seems to be little used. The pier at Goathorn ceased to be worked with the Second War requiring the peninsula as part of a bombing range. Much of the line that crossed Newton Heath was taken up in 1940 and there was no working north of the engine shed at NordenThe line was abandoned in 1937 and clay then left by lorry or via the Swanage Branch Line. To work the narrow-gauge line one steam-engine and several internal combustion engined rail tractors were purchased. The steam-engine was "Russell" a 2-6-2T Hunslet (1906) with a chequered history. In the final years of the Norden system a number of  Ruston & Hornsby 48DL class 0-4-0 engines operated on the line, numbers 392117, 175413 and 179889, also used for a while was a Motorail simplex (c/n 5252).

After the closure of Eldon sidings all clay exports were via lorry. For several years the clay was carried from the mines across the A351 by trains to the "Lorry Drop". It was realised that the lorries could take the clay directly from the mines and the cost of maintaining a railway system avoided. The transhipment buildings were raised to accommodate the lorries beneath them and in the early 1970s the railway system sold partly into preservation and the rest scrapped. Use of narrow gauge railways continued underground at Norden No 6 & 7 mines until all mining operations ceased in 1999.

Future

In 2014 the Purbeck Mining Museum set up a plan in conjunction with its governing body the Swanage Railway Trust for a forward plan for the future. The plan involved opening the museum on more days to boost numbers and increase access to areas of the museum previously restricted. Its first priority was to improve interior displays. The plan is now complete and now one of its main priorities is to restore skew arch bridge over the Swanage Railway and to enable access to Norden South, this will allow the Museum with the possibility of expanding the 2 ft gauge railway and operating a passenger service and demonstration clay trains on special event days. The museum also wants to develop a building for Secundus and wagon 28 and moving them from Corfe Castle Station.

Rolling Stock
All  gauge unless otherwise stated.

Steam locomotives

Diesel locomotives

Carriages

Goods wagons

References

External links

Swanage Railway website
Swanage Railway Trust website
Purbeck Mineral and Mining Museum current website
Purbeck Mineral and Mining Museum original website

Heritage railways in Dorset
Museums in Dorset
Railway museums in England
Mining museums in England
Corfe Castle
Narrow-gauge railway museums in the United Kingdom